Extertal is a municipality in the Lippe district of North Rhine-Westphalia, Germany, with c. 11,500 inhabitants (2013).

Extertal is located on the northern edge of the circle in the Teutoburg Nature Reserve, directly adjacent to Lower Saxony. The  Exter and Humme rivers flow through the region.  The municipality has its headquarters in the Bösingfeld district.  Neighbouring cities are Rinteln, Aerzen, Barntrup, Dörentrup and Kalletal.

The highest point of the city is at 371 metres above sea level.  The municipality dimensions are about 12.2 kilometres east-west and about 12.5 kilometres north-south.

Mayors
Elected in September 2020, the mayor of Extertal is Frank Meier.

Churches and religious communities

 Evangelical Reformed Church (Church of Lippe) in Bösingfeld, Mittelstrasse 33
 Evangelical Reformed Church (Church of Lippe) in Almena, Kirchstrasse 1, 32699 Extertal-Almena
 Evangelical Reformed Church (Church of Lippe) in Silixen, Dietrich-Bonhoeffer-Strasse 5
 Catholic Church: Adolf-Kolping-Weg 1
 Free Evangelical Community: Mühlenstrasse 4
 Jehovah's Witnesses: Papenweg 2
 New Apostolic Church: Bahnhofstrasse

References

External links
 Official website 

Towns in North Rhine-Westphalia
Lippe
Principality of Lippe